Peter Iden (born September 11, 1934) is a German theater critic and art critic.

Biography 
Iden was born in Meseritz, now Międzyrzecz, Poland. His family fled the Red Army to the British-occupied area and settled in Lauenburg on the Elbe. There, Iden grew up and attended the humanist branch of the Johanneum high school in Lüneburg. From 1955, he spent two years in California. After moving to Frankfurt am Main and graduating from the Helmholtz School in Frankfurt in 1958, Iden studied philosophy, history and theater at Goethe University in Frankfurt. He studied with Theodor W. Adorno and Max Horkheimer. Afterwards he continued his studies at the University of Vienna. There Iden was friends with artists Arnulf Rainer and Markus Prachensky.

Since 1961, Iden has written journalistic articles, notably for the Frankfurter Rundschau. At the same time, Iden met the director of the theater Erwin Piscator in Frankfurt, became his assistant and traveled with him for two years through Germany. Inspired by Piscator, he organized "Experimenta" with the theater editor Karlheinz Braun from 1966 to 1971 at the Theater am Turm, which was one of the first international festivals of experimental theater in Germany. In 1972 Iden was a member of the Documenta 5 organizing committee, with director Harald Szeemann, and the same year he became a member of the German PEN club. In 1980, he became a professor at the Hochschule für Musik und Darstellende Kunst in Frankfurt am Main.

Career 
From 1978 to 1987, he was the founding director of the Museum für Moderne Kunst Frankfurt. In 1981, after long negotiations with the heirs of Darmstadt entrepreneur Karl Ströher, he was able to acquire 87 works of American pop and minimal art, as well as high-quality German and European works of art between the 1950s and the 1970s for the museum under construction. Iden expands until 1987 the collection including important works of German and European art. From 1988, Jean-Christophe Ammann takes over the management of the museum and opens the new building of the Viennese architect Hans Hollein in June 1991.

From 1982 Iden was professor of theater and art theory at the University of Music and the Performing Arts in Frankfurt am Main and head of the theater department. He became known as a cultural journalist as an art and theater critic for the Frankfurter Rundschau, for which he has written over 3000 contributions over the years. He was editor-in-chief and from 1993 to 2000 head of the arts section (editorial code "P.I.") at the Frankfurter Rundschau.

In June 2004, Peter Iden conducted an interview with Jutta Lampe Sharing the event of the metamorphosis for the review of the Strasbourg National Theater L'Outrescène.

In 2009, Iden was the spokesperson for the curators who curated the much-loved “Sixty Years. Sixty works - Art of the Federal Republic of Germany "in the Martin-Gropius-Bau in Berlin.

Iden is the author and editor of numerous writings on contemporary theater and contemporary art.

Awards 
In 1995 he received the Goethe-Plakette des Landes Hessen and in 2006 the Goetheplakette der Stadt Frankfurt am Main.

Literature 
 Peter Iden, Dieter Hacker, Oedipus: Maler: neue Bilder und Blätter, Catalogue, éd. Brusberg, Berlin, 1992
 Peter Iden, Der Schein, was ist er, dem das Wesen fehlt?, Patronatsverein für die Theater der Stadt Frankfurt am Main, Francfort-sur-le-Main, 1992
 Peter Iden, Meine iebste Rolle, Insel-Verl., Francfort-sur-le-Main, 1993
 Peter Iden, Warum wir das Theater brauchen, Suhrkamp, Francfort-sur-le-Main, 1995
 Ingrid Mössinger, Peter Iden, Sam Francis, the shadow of colors, Kunstverein Ludwisgsburg, Ludwigsburg, 1995
 Ingrid Mössinger, Peter Iden, Sam Francis, the shadow of colors, éd. Stemmle, Kilchberg/Zurich, 1995
 Peter Iden, Jürgen Flimm, Fischer-Taschenbuch-Verl., Francfort-sur-le-Main, 1996
 Ingrid Mössinger, Beate Ritter, Gottfried Boehm, Peter Iden, et Wieland Schmied, Raimund Girke zum Siebzigsten, Quantum Books, 2000
 Éric Darragon, Peter Iden, Beate L. Ritter Georg Baselitz Mondrians Schwester, Berlin, 1997 / Kunstsammlungen Chemnitz, Kulturstiftung der Länder, 2003
 Peter Palitzsch, Peter Iden, Theater muss die Welt verändern, Henschel, Berlin, 2005

References 

Living people
1938 births
German art critics